Ponta do Sol is a headland located in the northwest of the island of Boa Vista. Cape Verde. It is the island's northernmost point.

The promontory and the area around it is designated a protected area as a nature reserve with a total of 465 hectares. It includes a marine strip 300 meters from the coast, covering 283 hectares.

The nature reserve protects emblematic birds including ospreys, and a volcanic landscape with fossil dunes.

References

Headlands of Cape Verde
Geography of Boa Vista, Cape Verde
Protected areas of Cape Verde